Cribrilina is a genus of bryozoans belonging to the family Cribrilinidae.

The genus has cosmopolitan distribution.

Species:

Cribrilina auriculata 
Cribrilina collaris 
Cribrilina crassicollis 
Cribrilina cryptooecium 
Cribrilina cuspidata 
Cribrilina dispersa 
Cribrilina ferganensis 
Cribrilina flavomaris 
Cribrilina gathensis 
Cribrilina gilbertensis 
Cribrilina hebetata 
Cribrilina immersa 
Cribrilina indica 
Cribrilina inermis 
Cribrilina jonesi 
Cribrilina laticostulata 
Cribrilina ligulata 
Cribrilina macropunctata 
Cribrilina marylandica 
Cribrilina messiniensis 
Cribrilina miocenica 
Cribrilina mucronata 
Cribrilina nevianii 
Cribrilina paucicostata 
Cribrilina punctata 
Cribrilina puncturata 
Cribrilina pupoides 
Cribrilina rathbunae 
Cribrilina reniformis 
Cribrilina rishtanensis 
Cribrilina simplex 
Cribrilina sparsiporis 
Cribrilina spiculifera 
Cribrilina spitzbergensis 
Cribrilina subpunctata 
Cribrilina tenuicostata 
Cribrilina triseriata 
Cribrilina turgida 
Cribrilina tutaksaiensis 
Cribrilina verrucosa 
Cribrilina vinei 
Cribrilina watersi

References

Bryozoan genera